The 2002 Tulane Green Wave football team represented the Tulane University in the 2002 college football season. Led by J. P. Losman, the Green Wave won the Hawaii Bowl for the first time in the school's history.

Schedule

Roster

Team players in the NFL
No Tulane Green Wave players were selected in the 2003 NFL Draft.

The following finished their college career in 2002, were not drafted, but played in the NFL.

References

Tulane
Tulane Green Wave football seasons
Hawaii Bowl champion seasons
Tulane Green Wave football